Bracken are several species of ferns, including:
 Pteridium esculentum, also called aruhe in New Zealand.

Bracken may also refer to:

 Bracken (band), UK, Leeds experimental post-rock band founded by Chris Adams
 Bracken (TV series), Irish television soap opera

Places

 Bracken, Indiana, a small town in the United States
 Bracken County, Kentucky
 Bracken, Missouri, an unincorporated community
 Bracken, Saskatchewan
 Bracken Library
 Bracken Health Sciences Library
 Bracken Cave

People
 Alexandra Bracken
 Bob Bracken
 Brendan Bracken
 Don Bracken
 Eddie Bracken
 Haley Bracken, Australian model and television personality
 Jack Bracken
 James C. Bracken, songwriter and the co-founder and co-owner of Vee-Jay Records
 James E. Bracken American racehorse trainer
 John Bracken
 Josephine Bracken
 Kate Bracken
 Kyran Bracken
 Nathan Bracken
 Paul Bracken
 Peg Bracken
 Peter Bracken
 Raymond Bracken
 Thomas Bracken
 William Bracken